Zagné is a town in western Ivory Coast. It is a sub-prefecture of Taï Department in Cavally Region, Montagnes District.

Prior to 2013, when Taï Department was created, Zagné was a sub-prefecture of Guiglo Department. A small portion of the sub-prefecture of Zagné lies within Taï National Park.

Zagné was a commune until March 2012, when it became one of 1126 communes nationwide that were abolished.

Notable people
Adé Liz, singer

Villages
In 2014, the population of the sub-prefecture of Zagné was 71,020. The 8 villages of this sub-prefecture and their population are:
 Djidoubaye (5 092)
 Gahably (1 614)
 Goulégui-Béoué (2 939)
 Kéibly (5 905)
 Tienkoula (2 229)
 Vodélobly (2 314)
 Zagné (48 863)
 Zaϊpobly (2 064)

References

Sub-prefectures of Cavally Region
Former communes of Ivory Coast